The 2015 Pro Golf Tour was the 19th season of the Pro Golf Tour (formerly the EPD Tour), one of four third-tier tours recognised by the European Tour. In July, it was announced that all Pro Golf Tour events, beginning with the Lotos Polish Open, would receive Official World Golf Ranking points at the minimum level of 4 points for the winner of a 54-hole event.

Schedule
The following table lists official events during the 2015 season.

Order of Merit
The Order of Merit was based on prize money won during the season, calculated using a points-based system. The top five players on the tour (not otherwise exempt) earned status to play on the 2016 Challenge Tour.

Notes

References

Pro Golf Tour